The Easton Three-Star Player of the Year was an annual award given out at the conclusion of the College Hockey America regular season to the player who finished with the most 'stars-of-the-game' points in CHA play. While each school named a Three-Star Player of the Year, the official CHA winner was the player who had the highest point total amongst all conference teams. points were calculated as 5 for a number one star, 3 for a number two star, and 1 for a number three star. Any player on the game roster was eligible to be star and only games between CHA opponents would be counted towards the Three-Star Player of the Year Standings.

The Easton Three-Star Player of the Year was first awarded in 2005 but was discontinued after 2008. It is the only official individual CHA trophy that was not bestowed each year of the conference's existence.

Award winners

Winners by school

Winners by position

See also
CHA Awards

References

General

Specific

External links
CHA Awards (Incomplete)

College ice hockey trophies and awards in the United States